Smoked egg is a food that involves the smoking of eggs and fish eggs. Smoked eggs can be prepared with hard boiled eggs that are then smoked, or by smoking uncooked eggs in their shells. Additionally, smoked egg has been defined as a type of hors d'oeuvre of hard boiled eggs that are shelled, marinated and then smoked.

Smoked caviar
Some caviars that are sometimes smoked include cod roe, which is common in Norway, mullet roe and sturgeon roe. Another product is smoked-egg liquor, which can be derived from raw frozen salmon roe.

Dishes

Smoked eggs can be made into smoked egg pâté. Additional dishes and foods prepared from smoked eggs are egg salad, vinaigrette dressing and dips One version of niçoise salad uses a smoked egg foam as an ingredient. Purées prepared with smoked egg have been used to enhance the flavor of various dishes.

See also

References

Bibliography
 Steven Raichlen (2010). Planet Barbecue!: 309 Recipes, 60 Countries. Workman Publishing.

Further reading
 Shanghainese Homestyle Cooking. pp. 86–87.
 Hard Smoked Eggs. O, The Oprah Magazine.

External links
 Israeli smoked egg pate . Primal Grill with Steve Raichlen.

Chinese cuisine
Vietnamese cuisine
Egg dishes
Smoked food